Ronald Urick (born January 7, 1968) is an American sprint canoer who competed in the late 1980s. At the 1988 Summer Olympics in Seoul, he was eliminated in the repechages of the C-2 1000 m event.

References
Sports-Reference.com profile

1968 births
American male canoeists
Canoeists at the 1988 Summer Olympics
Living people
Olympic canoeists of the United States
Place of birth missing (living people)